Wakatomika Creek is a tributary of the Muskingum River, 42.6 mi (68.6 km) long, in central Ohio in the United States.  Via the Muskingum and Ohio Rivers, it is part of the watershed of the Mississippi River, draining an area of 234 mi² (606 km²)

Course
Wakatomika Creek rises in western Coshocton County and flows westwardly into Knox County; then southwardly into northeastern Licking and southwestern Coshocton Counties; and eastwardly through northwestern Muskingum County, past the southern edge of the village of Frazeysburg.  It joins the Muskingum River from the west at the village of Dresden.

A USGS stream gauge on the creek near Frazeysburg recorded a mean annual discharge of  during water years 1937-2019.

Location

Mouth: Confluence with the Muskingum River at Dresden 
Origin: Coshocton County east of Newcastle

Tributaries
Winding Fork drains much of southern Perry Township and northwestern Pike Township in Coshocton County, and empties into Wakatomika Creek near the State Route 79 bridge over Wakatomika Creek. Brushy Fork drains much of Licking County's Perry Township, and empties into Wakatomika Creek in the very northwestern corner of Muskingum County. Black Run empties into Wakatomika Creek just southwest of Frazeysburg.  Little Wakatomika Creek empties into Wakatomika Creek near the intersection of state routes 60 and 16.

History
Wakatomika Creek takes its name from the Shawnee village of Wakatomika, which was located at the mouth of Wakatomika Creek along the Muskingum River, at about the present-day site of Dresden, Ohio. The village was destroyed during Lord Dunmore's War in 1774. After the American Revolution, the valley along Wakatomika Creek was one of the first areas in present-day Muskingum County to be settled by white Americans. Today, the Longaberger Basket Company maintains a large facility in the Wakatomika Valley between Frazeysburg and Dresden.

Variant names and spellings
According to the Geographic Names Information System, Wakatomika Creek has also been known historically as:

See also
List of rivers of Ohio

References

Rivers of Ohio
Muskingum River
Rivers of Coshocton County, Ohio
Rivers of Knox County, Ohio
Rivers of Licking County, Ohio
Rivers of Muskingum County, Ohio